Red Bull Art of Motion is a parkour and freerunning competition, established in 2007 and created by Red Bull. It is an international competition with qualifiers being held in various regional competitions around the world throughout the year. Winners from the regional competitions each year earn their ticket to get to the finals, held towards the end of the year. 

The inaugural competition was held in Vienna, Austria, and has since been held in various other countries, including England, Kuwait, United States, Sweden, Greece (Santorini), and most recently in Matera, Italy. Judging of the event is based on several criteria including creativity, flow, execution, and difficulty.

List of winners

Best Female

Video Competition 2011 
 Failaka Island, Kuwait

Best Trick Table  
Men

Women

Medal table (Countries)
Men

Women

Medal table (Athletes)

Santorini Series (2011-2017)

2011
First Run

Final Run

Gaetan Bouillet & Paulo Tavares  - The athletes did not participate on the AOM 2012
Green color indicates and prizers athletes who automatically come to the AOM 2012

2012
Rules. In the first run involved 21 athletes, where, after judicial decisions go into the final eight athletes who automatically get to the next AOM
Online qualification (Men)

Online qualification (Women)

Prizers AOM 2012 in  Lavertezzo, Switzerland.

On-site qualification

First Run

Green color indicates athletes who have reached the final, and automatically come to the AOM 2013
Final Run

Jason Paul, Luci Romberg & Ryan Doyle  - The athletes did not participate on the AOM 2013

2013
Rules: 18 athletes compete, 8 go to the finals and those 8 automatically get to go to the next year's AOM.
 Judges

Online qualification (Men)

Online qualification (Women)

On-site qualification

 Notes
  Jesse La Flair won an instant qualification to the AOM through making third place in the Air Wipp challenge that year

First Run

Green color indicates athletes who have reached the final, and automatically come to the AOM 2014
Final Run

2014
 Rules. 18 athletes are divided into 3 groups of 6. After the first run from each group 2 of the best athletes in the final, and automatically get the next AOM.
 Judges

Online qualification (Men)

Online qualification (Women)

On-site qualification

First Run 
Group 1

Group 2 

Group 3 

Green color indicates athletes who have reached the final, and automatically come to the AOM 2015
Final Run

2015
 Judges

Online qualification (4 men & 3 women). From 3 to 9 August 2015 announced the winners of each day in the online qualification.

Lynn Jung doesn't take part in competition.
 16 August 2015 determine the winner of the Audience Award in the online selection which will be paid for flights and accommodation for qualifying for the location 1 October 2015 in Santorini -  Cory DeMeyers

On-site qualification

First Run 
Group 1

Group 2 

Group 3 

Green color indicates athletes who have reached the final, and automatically come to the AOM 2016
Final Run

2016
Judges

Online qualification (Men)

Online qualification (Women)

By voting on the website of Red bull gets a chance to qualify on-site -  Mehdi Moussaid (over 7000 votes)
On-site qualification 

  Alexander Schauer  had injury and will not participate in AoM 2016. His place will take part  Cory DeMeyers

First Run
Group 1

Group 2 

Group 3 

Green color indicates athletes who have reached the final, and automatically come to the AOM 2017
Final Run

2017
Judges:

Online qualification (4 men & 3 women). From 12 to 18 July 2017 announced the winners of each day in the online qualification.

With 19954 votes  Andre Luiz Freitas wins a trip to Santorini! He will get a chance to prove himself at the Red Bull Art of Motion On-site Qualifier 2017
 Stanislavs Lazdans had injury and will not participate in AoM 2017. His place will take part  Krystian Kowalewski

Top 20 On-site  athletes :
Green color indicates athletes who won On-site qualification and will participate in main event of AoM 2017

 Krystian Kowalewski  had injury and will not participate in AoM 2017. His place will take part  Dominic Di Tommaso
 Sydney Olson won't be able to compete. Last minute replacement is  Kamil Tobiasz who placed 7th in the Onsite Qualifier.

First Run
Group 1

Group 2 

Group 3 

Green color indicates athletes who have reached the final.
Final Run

Matera 2019
12 men and 6 women will compete on AoM 2019 in  Matera.
Participants will include the winners of the 2017 Red Bull Art of Motion and other international competitions (Air Wipp Challenge, NAPC and Lion City), an Italian wildcard alongside winners of the online and onsite qualifications.

Judges:

Participants (Golden Ticket):

 Nathan Weston (2nd runner-up) qualifies for AoM 2019 via Asian Parkour Championship as  Montree Bowdok (Winner) &  Yurai Miyazaki (1st runner-up) have pre-qualified through online qualification.

Online qualification (4 men & 4 women):

On-site qualification (3 men & 2 women)

  Alexander Titarenko &  Stefan Dollinger not involved due to injuries. Their places have taken  Dominic Di Tommaso &  Charles Luong

First Run

   D - Difficulty
   E - Execution
   F - Flow 
   C - Creativity
   OI - Overall Impression

Group 1

Group 2 

Group 3 

Green color indicates athletes who have reached the final.
Final Run

Pireaus 2021
Red Bull Art of Motion is back in 2021!  The best tracers will gather again in Greece to participate in the main international freerunning competition .  The competition will take place in a new unexpected location - in the heart of Piraeus, in the port of Microlimano, where participants will have to show their skills on board two huge sailing yachts.

Judges:

Participants:

TOP-3 of AoM 2019

 Dimitris Kyrsanidis is injured. His place takes  Joshua Malone.
Online qualification (6 men & 6 women)

 Yasin Hemati qualified but could not attend. 

Onsite qualification

First Run

   D - Difficulty
   E - Execution
   F - Flow 
   C - Creativity
   OI - Overall Impression

Group 1

Group 2 

 Jarrod Luty got injured while performing. 
Group 3 

Green color indicates athletes who have reached the final.
Final Run

  Didi Alaoui refused to continue performing after an unsuccessful jump.

Astypalea 2022 

The new three-day contest format (June 9-12).

Judges:

Participants:

TOP-3 of AoM 2021

Best Female of AoM 2021

Invited Athletes

Greek Wildcard

Online Qualification

References

External links
 Red Bull Art of Motion

Parkour
Red Bull sports events
Obstacle racing